Dušan Prelević "Prele" (Serbian Cyrillic: Душан Прелевић Преле; November 11, 1948 – July 28, 2007) was a Serbian singer, journalist, and writer.

During his career Prelević released three solo albums and a large number of 7-inch singles. He also made recordings with rock band Korni Grupa, symphonic rock band Opus, and jazz rock band Oliver. He was widely known for his raspy voice and, since the first half of the 1990s, an eyepatch (which he wore because he lost his right eye in a fight).

Biography

Early life
Prelević was born in 1948 in Belgrade. In his early years, Prelević was interested in sports: he played in football clubs Bulburderac and Red Star Belgrade, and was a goalkeeper in the ice hockey club Partizan.

Musical career
Prelević started to perform in 1965, mostly soul and rhythm and blues standards. He was a member of the bands Orkani, Juniori, Tomi Sovilj i Njegove Siluete and Vizije.

In 1968, he became the vocalist for Korni Grupa, but spent only several months as the band member, recording the song "Čovek i pas" ("A Man and a Dog"), which was released as a B-side of the single "Cigu-ligu". Prelević was excluded from Korni Grupa by the band's leader Kornelije Kovač due to Prelević's negligence towards work in the band, and was replaced by Dalibor Brun.

In 1970, on the Beogradsko proleće festival, Prelević performed the song "Da l' postoji ona koju sanjam" ("Does the Girl from My Dreams Exist"). During the same year, on the Festival Omladina in Subotica he was awarded for the song "Kažu" ("They Say"), but he went on the stage intoxicated, which was first in a large number of on scene scandals he made during his career. Due to the scandal he was banned from all Radio Television Belgrade programs for a year, which he spent performing in American clubs and in the mountain resort Garmisch-Partenkirchen in Germany.

In 1974, he joined the short-lasting jazz rock supergroup Oliver, which consisted of Prelević, Oliver Mandić, members of Pop Mašina, and other musicians from Belgrade. With the band, Prelević recorded the song "Tajna" ("A Secret"). During the same year, Prelević and the members of Korni Grupa, under the name Prele i Prijatelji (Prele and Friends), recorded the single "Vrati mi snove za dvoje" ("Return Dreams for Two to Me"). In 1975, he joined the reformed symphonic rock band Opus, with which he recorded their only studio album, Opus 1, released in 1975.

In 1979, on Beogradsko proleće, he performed the song "Gubitnik sam ja" ("I am a Loser"), written by Oliver Mandić. The song was released on the album Beogradsko proleće 1979 In 1980, he appeared on the Opatija festival with the song "Bela soba" ("White Room"), with lyrics written by Prelević and composed by Mandić. At the beginning of the 1980s, Prelević performed in clubs in the Netherlands.

In 1982, Prelević released his first solo album entitled Na oštrici brijača (On the Razor's Edge). Songs featured on the album were written by Kire Mitrev, Bora Đorđević and Prelević himself. The album was recorded with keyboardist Laza Ristovski, guitarist Enes Mekić, drummer Vladimir "Furda" Furduj, bass guitarist Nenad Stefanović "Japanac", trumpeters Stjepko Gut and Georgi Dimitrovski, saxophonist Ivan Švager and trombonist Kire Mitrev. The song "Na oštrici brijača" featured the actor Slobodan Aligrudić as the narrator. The album featured a cover of Indexi song "Jutro će promeniti sve" ("The Morning Will Change Everything").

In 1991, Prelević released his second solo album, U redu, pobedio sam (All Right, I Won), which featured songs from his first album and covers of jazz standards which he recorded with trumpeter Duško Gojković, pianist Miša Krstić, bassist Miša Blam and drummer Lala Kovač. His September 1991 concert in Filmski grad and his March 1992 concert in Belgrade's Dom Sindikata featured Indexi as special guests. In 1994, for the album La Reine Margot, which featured music composed by Goran Bregović for the theatre play of the same name, Prelević sung the song "La Nuit", for which he also wrote lyrics. During the same year, he made a guest appearance in Vlada i Bajka song "Beograd", released on their album Ja nisam ja (I am not I). The song also featured Bora Đorđević, Dragan Nikolić, Dragan Bjelogrlić and Nikola Kojo.

In 1996, he released the album Ja, Prele (I, Prele). The album featured large number of musicians: Radomir Mihajlović Točak, Duda Bezuha and Dragan "Krle" Jovanović on guitars, Saša Lokner on organ, Đorđe Petrović on keyboards, Nebojša Ignjatović on bass, Čeda Macura on drums, Vlada i Bajka and Nikola Hadži Nikolić on vocals, and others. The album, among other songs, featured a new version of "Čovek i pas", a cover of Arsen Dedić song "O, mladosti" ("Oh, Youth"), a cover of Atomsko Sklonište song "Treba imat' dušu" ("One Must Have a Soul"), a Serbian language cover of Eric Clapton's song "Tears in Heaven", entitled "Kada budem na nebu" ("When I'm in Heaven"), a Serbian language cover of Rolling Stones' song "The Last Time", entitled "Neću da se predam" ("I Won't Give Up"), and a cover of Beatles' song "In My Life".

In 2002, the CD Santa Maria Della Salute was released. The CD featured actor Petar Kralj reciting the lyrics of Laza Kostić's poem "Santa Maria Della Salute" and Prelević singing the song composed on the poem lyrics.

Journalistic and literary career
Since the first half of the 1980s, Prelević wrote for the magazines Duga, NIN, RTV Revija and Književne novine.

Prelević wrote two books of stories: Kako je umro Baš Ćelik (How Baš Čelik Died; 1987) and Voz za jednu bitangu (A Train for a Rascal; 1991). With Milan Oklopčić and Bogdan Tirnanić he coauthored the book Beogradske priče (Belgrade Stories).  He edited the monography Njim samim (By Himself), which featured stories, poems and notes written by actor Zoran Radmilović.

Prelević was a member of the Association of Writers of Serbia.

Theatre, film and television activities
In 1969, Prelević was part of the cast of Yugoslav production of Hair, which premiered on March 20, 1969 in Atelje 212. Prelević wrote the screenplay for the film Poslednji krug u Monci. He acted in Branko Baletić's TV series Kako (How) and in the film Paket aranžman (Package Deal).

Politics
Prelević was a member of Democratic Party of Serbia. He was arrested during March 9, 1991 protest. He fought in Yugoslavia Civil War.

Death
Prelević died in Belgrade after long illness, on July 28, 2007. He was 58 years old.

Legacy
A documentary about Prelević, entitled U redu, pobedio sam after his second studio album, was released in 2010. The film, directed by Vladimir Petrović, featured interviews with Prelević, actors Petar Božović and Dragan Nikolić, writers Momo Kapor and Brana Crnčević, journalist Bogdan Tirnanić and others.

Prelević's song "Bela soba" ("White Room") was covered by Serbian band 357 on their 2002 album Iz gazda Žikine kuhinje. The song "Majko, na šta liči tvoj sin" ("Mother, Look at the State Your Son Is In") was remixed in 2010 by the Serbian project Laura 2000 on their debut studio album ...pobiću se zadnji put da vidim da l' sam star (... I'll Have a One Last Fistfight Just to See if I'm Old).

Discography

With Korni Grupa

Singles
"Čovek i pas" (B-side of "Cigu-ligu"; 1969)

With Opus

Studio albums
Opus 1 (1975)

Solo

Studio albums
Na oštrici brijača (1982)
Ja, Prele (1996)

Compilation albums
U redu, pobedio sam (1991)

Singles
"Da l' postoji ona koju sanjam" / "Kažu" (1970)
"Hej, hej, okreni se" / "Jesenja pesma" (1973)
"Nisam više tvoj" / "U noćima bez sna" (1973)
"Vrati mi snove za dvoje" / "Ne traži ljubav" (1974)
"Mojih pet minuta" / "Povedi me" (1978)
"Hoću da pamtiš" / "Hoću da pamtiš – Instrumental" (1980)

With Oliver

Singles
"Tajna" / "Prošlo je sve" (1974)

Other appearances
"Ljubav naša umire" (duet with Nada Pavlović, B-side of Nada Pavlović – "Brodvej"; 1980)
"La Nuit" (Goran Bregović – La Reine Margot; 1994)
"Beograd" (Vlada i Bajka – Ja nisam ja; 1994)
"Santa Maria Della Salute" (Santa Maria Della Salute; 2002)

References

Further reading 
 EX YU ROCK enciklopedija 1960–2006, Janjatović Petar;

External links 
Dušan Prelević at Discogs

1948 births
2007 deaths
Singers from Belgrade
20th-century Serbian male singers
Serbian blues singers
Serbian rock singers
Serbian journalists
Serbian male short story writers
Yugoslav male singers
Yugoslav rock singers
Serbian writers
Burials at Belgrade New Cemetery
20th-century journalists